The Wieluń Land (Latin: Terra Velumensis), originally known as the Ruda Land (Polish: ziemia rudzka; Latin: terra Rudensis, territorium Rudense), was a land of the Kingdom of Poland and the Polish–Lithuanian Commonwealth, which for centuries was part of Sieradz Voivodeship, Province of Greater Poland.

History

It was based on the medieval Castellany of Ruda, which was first mentioned in the 1136 Bull of Gniezno, and during the period known as Fragmentation of Poland (see Testament of Bolesław III Krzywousty), it was part of proper Greater Poland. During few years in the 13th century, it was twice ruled by the Dukes of Silesia. In 1281, the castellany was moved from Ruda to nearby Wieluń.

In both Kingdom of Poland and the Polish–Lithuanian Commonwealth, Wieluń Land had its own offices, and the Castellan of Wieluń was one of Senators of Poland. The land had four starostas – at Wieluń itself, Ostrzeszów, Bolesławiec and Grabów nad Prosną. Two deputies to the Sejm were elected at Wieluń's Sejmiks. Furthermore, the Voivode of Sieradz was obliged to appoint his deputy from Wieluń. Wieluń Land had its own coat of arms, established between 1410 and 1434.

Nowadays

Wieluń Land is also a historical subregion in southern Greater Poland, which covers current counties of Wieluń, Ostrzeszów, Kępno (eastern half with the capital) and Wieruszów, as well as some locations in the counties of Olesno, Pajęczno, Kłobuck, and also Częstochowa (an exclave). It has about 3,000 km2 and 200,000 inhabitants.

Sources 
 History of Wieluń and its land 

Ziemias
History of Greater Poland